Ramiah is a surname. Notable people with the surname include:

B. S. Ramiah (1905–1983), Indian journalist
K. Ramiah (1892–1988), Indian politician
Kailasa Venkata Ramiah (1926–1994), Indian academic
Krishnaswami Ramiah (1892–1988), Indian geneticist and politician

Indian surnames